{{Infobox basketball club
| color1        =
| color2        =
| name          =Pays d'Aix Basket 13
| nickname      =
| logo          = Pays d'Aix Basket 13 logo.jpg
| imagesize     =
| leagues       =LFB
| founded       =1952
| history       =
| arena         =La Pioline
| location      =Aix-en-Provence, France
| colors        =Red and yellow
| president     =Guy Boillon
| coach         =Bruno Blier
| championships =1 Eurocup1 French cup
| website       =paysaixbasket13.free.fr
| h_body=FF0000
|h_pattern_b=
|h_shorts=FF0000
|h_pattern_s=
| a_body=FFFF00
|a_pattern_b=
|a_shorts=FFFF00
|a_pattern_s=
}}Pays d'Aix Basket 13 is a French women's basketball club from Aix-en-Provence, currently playing in the LFB. Originally established in 1952 as ASPTT Aix-en-Provence, it took its current name in 2004.

The club's first major success was reaching the 1998 Ronchetti Cup's final, lost to Gysev Sopron. Two years later it won its first title, the 2000 national cup, and in 2003 it won the new FIBA Eurocup, which succeeded the Ronchetti Cup, beating CB Islas Canarias in the final. It again reached the Eurocup's final in 2006, but lost to Spartak Moscow Region.

Titles
 FIBA Eurocup (1) 2003
 Coupe de France (1)' 2000

2012-13 roster
 (1.96)  Marianna Tolo
 (1.92)  Cayla Francis
 (1.85)  Viviane Adjutor
 (1.85)  Natty Chambertin
 (1.85)  Lizanne Murphy
 (1.80)  Kelly Corre
 (1.78)  Adja Konteh
 (1.78)  Shona Thorburn
 (1.76)  Sylvie Gruszczynski
 (1.69)''  Lisa Lefevre

References

Women's basketball teams in France
Aix-en-Provence
Basketball teams established in 1952
EuroCup Women-winning clubs